KTMG (99.1 FM, "Magic 99.1") is an American commercial adult contemporary music radio station in Prescott, Arizona, broadcasting to the Prescott, Arizona, area.

History
KNOT-FM signed on 98.3 MHz in 1978 after a multi-year fight between Parkell Broadcasting, which built the station, and Southwest Broadcasting Company, which sought to have it denied. Payne-Prescott Broadcasting Company bought KNOT-FM in 1981 and moved it to 99.1 in 1993.

External links
KTMG official website

Prescott, Arizona
TMG
1978 establishments in Arizona
Radio stations established in 1978